Bob Bryan and Mike Bryan successfully defended their 2009 title. They defeated Polish pair Mariusz Fyrstenberg and Marcin Matkowski 6–1, 7–6(7–5) in the final match.

Seeds

Draw

Draw

References
 Doubles Draw

China Open - Doubles